Wang Jinping (born 11 May 1971) is a Chinese biathlete. She competed at the 1992 Winter Olympics and the 1994 Winter Olympics. She is the younger sister of her teammate Wang Jinfen.

References

1971 births
Living people
Biathletes at the 1992 Winter Olympics
Biathletes at the 1994 Winter Olympics
Chinese female biathletes
Olympic biathletes of China
Place of birth missing (living people)
Universiade bronze medalists for China
Universiade medalists in biathlon
Competitors at the 1993 Winter Universiade